Lot 25 is a township in Prince County, Prince Edward Island, Canada.  It is part of St. David's Parish. Lot 25 was awarded to Archibald Kennedy and James Campbell in the 1767 land lottery. One half was sold for arrears in quitrent in 1781.

Communities

Incorporated municipalities:

 none

Civic address communities:

 Central Bedeque
 Freetown
 Kelvin Grove
 Lower Freetown
 Norboro
 North Bedeque
 South Freetown
 Springfield
 Wilmot Valley

References

25
Geography of Prince County, Prince Edward Island